is a Japanese footballer. As of 2017, he plays for Al Shabab Club.

Career

Born in Tsu, Mie, Iwasaki is known in Brazil for having played in Paraná clubs.

In 2013, he moved to India for joining the I-League side Rangdajied United.

In February 2016, Iwasaki moved to Australia, joining National Premier Leagues Victoria side Green Gully SC, led by Arthur Papas, who discovered the player during his time in India.

On 5 April 2017, he joined Lithuanian A Lyga club Kauno Žalgiris.

On 1 October, he joined Oman premier league club Al Shabab Club

Club statistics

References

External links

 

1987 births
Living people
Chukyo University alumni
Association football people from Mie Prefecture
Japanese footballers
J1 League players
J2 League players
I-League players
A Lyga players
Pato Branco Esporte Clube players
Paraná Clube players
Albirex Niigata players
FC Gifu players
Rangdajied United F.C. players
FK Kauno Žalgiris players
Japanese expatriate footballers
Expatriate footballers in Brazil
Japanese expatriate sportspeople in Paraguay
Expatriate footballers in Paraguay
Expatriate footballers in India
Expatriate footballers in Lithuania
Japanese expatriate sportspeople in Lithuania
Association football wingers
Expatriate footballers in Oman
Association football defenders
Expatriate soccer players in Australia
Green Gully SC players
T.C. Sports Club players